The men's 100 kg judo competition at the 2016 Summer Paralympics was held on 10 September at Carioca Arena 3.

Results

Repechage

References

External links
 

M100
Judo at the Summer Paralympics Men's Half Heavyweight